Translation initiation factor eIF-2B subunit beta is a protein that in humans is encoded by the EIF2B2 gene.

Function 

Eukaryotic initiation factor-2B (EIF2B) is a GTP exchange protein essential for protein synthesis. It consists of alpha (EIF2B1; MIM 606686), beta (EIF2B2), gamma (EIF2B3; MIM 606273), delta (EIF2B4; MIM 606687), and epsilon (EIF2B5; MIM 603945) subunits. EIF2B activates its EIF2 (see MIM 603907) substrate by exchanging EIF2-bound GDP for GTP.

Interactions 

EIF2B2 has been shown to interact with EIF2B5 and NCK1.

References

Further reading